Nan Melville (October 7, 1949 – March 18, 2022) was an American photographer. She specialized in dance photography.

References

External links
Official website

1949 births
2022 deaths
20th-century American women
21st-century American women
American photographers
Dance photographers